English titles may refer to:

The Peerage of England
When to capitalize titles of works in English
English honorifics such as "Mr.", "Miss", "Mrs.", or "Dr.", sometimes referred to as "titles"